A tankwa is a type of Ethiopian reed boat made from papyrus, used primarily in the area of Lake Tana.

References
 Aak to Zumbra, A dictionary of the World`s Watercraft, Basil Greenhill, 2000, 
 Gilbert, Gregory Phillip (1962) Ancient Egyptian Sea Power and the Origin of Maritime Forces . National Library of Australian Cataloguing-in-Publication entry, 
 Heyerdahl, Thor (1972) The Ra Expeditions. Amazon. Signet. 

Boat types